"Speak Low" is a 1943 popular song composed by Kurt Weill, with lyrics by Ogden Nash.

Speak Low may also refer to:
 Speak Low (band), a Spanish funk combo
 Speak Low (Walter Bishop Jr. album), 1961
 Speak Low (Patrice Jégou album), 2014
 Speak Low, a 2009 poetry collection by Carl Phillips
 "Speak Low", a 1992 song by George Duke from the album Snapshot